Sheykh Saleh may refer to:
 Sheykh Saleh, Kermanshah (شيخ صله - Sheykh Saleh)
 Sheykh Saleh, Dasht-e Azadegan, Khuzestan Province (شيخ صالح - Sheykh Şāleḥ)
 Sheykh Saleh, Shush, Khuzestan Province (شيخ صالح - Sheykh Şāleḥ)

See also
 Sheykh Saleh Qandi